Byron's Pool is a 4.4 hectare Local Nature Reserve in Grantchester in Cambridgeshire. It is managed by Cambridge City Council and the City Greenways Project.

The site is named after Lord Byron, who used to swim in the water. It is a pool and adjacent woodland next to the River Cam and Trumpington Meadows. Birds include little grebes and grey wagtails, and there are frogs, butterflies, damselflies and dragonflies.

There is access from Grantchester Road.

References

Local Nature Reserves in Cambridgeshire
River Cam